The Mosaic Templars State Temple is a historic African-American fraternal benefit society building at 906 South Broadway Street in Little Rock, Arkansas.  It is a two-story masonry structure, built of brick and terra cotta. The front facade is symmetrical, with ornately decorated elements rising to a parapet.  It was built in 1921 to house the headquarters of the state chapter of the Mosaic Templars of America, an African-American fraternal society founded by former slaves after the American Civil War.  The building was part of a complex which originally included three buildings, one of which was the organization's national headquarters; the other two buildings were destroyed by fire.

The building was listed on the National Register of Historic Places in 2018.

See also
National Register of Historic Places in Little Rock, Arkansas

References

Buildings and structures completed in 1921
Buildings and structures in Little Rock, Arkansas
National Register of Historic Places in Little Rock, Arkansas